Khalajabad (also Romanized as Khalajābād; also known as Qalīchābād) is a village in Neyzar Rural District, Salafchegan District, Qom County, Qom Province, Iran. At the 2006 census, its population was 282, in 73 families.

References 

Populated places in Qom Province